The North Cheshire Way is a  long-distance footpath in Cheshire, England. It runs approximately eastwards from Hooton railway station on the Wirral peninsula to Disley railway station on the edge of the Peak District, where it connects with the Gritstone Trail. There is a  spur from Chester to Croughton.

The path was developed by the Mid-Cheshire Footpath Society and opened in September 2006. It is Cheshire's longest long-distance footpath and is waymarked with yellow disks marked "NCW".

Route
The North Cheshire Way passes through or near the following places:

 Hooton
 Ledsham
 Capenhurst
 Backford
 Croughton
 Blacon
 Chester railway station
 Stoak
 Bridge Trafford
 Dunham on the Hill
 Alvanley
 Helsby Hill
 Frodsham Hill
 Crewood Hall
 Dutton Viaduct
 Acton Bridge
 Barnton
 Anderton Boat Lift
 Marbury Country Park
 Great Budworth
 Arley and Arley Hall
 Tabley
 Knutsford
 Mobberley
 Manchester Airport
 Quarry Bank Mill (Styal)
 Wilmslow
 Alderley Edge
 Mottram Hall
 Adlington Hall and Adlington
 Lyme Park
 Disley

Intersections with other long-distance paths include the Wirral Way at Hooton, the Sandstone Trail near Helsby, the Cheshire Ring at Barnton and near Bollington, and the Gritstone Trail at Lyme Park and Disley. The route crosses the Shropshire Union Canal near Stoak and the River Gowy at Bridge Trafford. It follows the River Weaver between Frodsham and Barnton, the Trent and Mersey Canal near Marbury Country Park, the River Bollin from Styal to Wilmslow, and the Macclesfield Canal briefly near Adlington.

See also

 South Cheshire Way
 List of recreational walks in Cheshire

References

Footpaths in Cheshire
Long-distance footpaths in England
Cheshire, North